Ian Baker may refer to:

Iain Baker, musician with Jesus Jones
Ian Baker-Finch (born 1960), Australian professional golfer
Ian Baker (architect) (1923–2010), British architect
Ian Baker (British Army officer) (1927–2005), British general
Ian Baker (basketball) (born 1993) American basketball player
Ian Baker (cinematographer) (born 1947), Australian cinematographer
Ian Baker (politician) (born 1944), Australian politician and journalist
Ian Baker (footballer) (born 1955), Australian rules footballer

See also
Ian Barker (disambiguation)